Richard Boys (17 June 1849 – 4 January 1896) was an English cricketer active in 1877 who played for Lancashire. He was born in Aberdour, Fife and died in Burnley. He appeared in one first-class match as a righthanded batsman, scoring 13 runs with a highest score of 10, and held two catches.

Notes

1849 births
1896 deaths
English cricketers
Lancashire cricketers
Sportspeople from Fife
People from Aberdour